There are about 53,000 to 75,000 Lebanese Uruguayans, or Uruguayans of Lebanese origin. The Lebanese are one of the larger non-European communities, though still not as large a group as most European groups. Relations between Uruguay and Lebanon have always been close.

History
The first Lebanese immigrants to Uruguay arrived in the 1860s, settling in Montevideo around Juan Lindolfo Cuestas street. These early immigrants were mainly Maronite Christians, speaking only Arabic.  The last great influx of Lebanese came in the 1920s along with other nationalities like Syrians and Europeans. Between 1908 and 1930, Montevideo's population doubled. Some of them also settled in the frontier city of Rivera.

On January 21, 1924, the Apostolic Missionary of Maronites was established by decree in Uruguay. On March 10, 1925, Monseñor Shallita arrived in Montevideo from Naples to lead the mission.

The early settlers faced some discrimination as "Asiatics", and a few were unable to adapt and returned to their homeland. However, most became established as small businessmen and entrepreneurs, and successfully adjusted to the society of their adopted country. Although retaining some cultural characteristics, notably the Lebanese cuisine, most Uruguayans of Lebanese origin no longer speak Arabic and have fully assimilated.

In 1997, the house speaker of Uruguay visited Lebanon and met Patriarch Sfeir. He noted that the 99-seat parliament in Uruguay included two members with Lebanese origins including himself. In 1954 there were 15,000 people of Lebanese descent living in Uruguay. By 2009 the number had grown to between 53,000 and 70,000. In July 2009, the Lebanese Society in Uruguay celebrated its 75th anniversary. The 2011 Uruguayan census revealed 136 people who declared Lebanon as their country of birth.

The majority of Lebanese-Uruguayans are Christians who belong to various churches, including the Maronite Church (they have their own church, Our Lady of Lebanon), Roman Catholic, Eastern Orthodox and Melkite Catholic. There was also a small presence of Lebanese Jews. A scant number are Muslims.

Notable Uruguayans of Lebanese origin
Felipe Seade (1912 – 18 January 1969) was a social-realist painter and teacher born in Santiago de Chile, the elder son of a Lebanese immigrant family, who spent most of his life in Uruguay after moving to Montevideo at the age of 12.

 Alberto Abdala (1920–1986), born of Lebanese immigrant parents, was a Uruguayan politician and painter who was Vice-President of Uruguay from 1967 to 1972. He was noted for his abstract compositions in oil on glass.

 Amir Hamed (1962), Uruguayan writer and translator
 Jorge Nasser (1956), musician
 Dahd Sfeir (1932-2015), Uruguayan singer and actress
Bruno Sfeir is a well-known painter whose work shows Cubist, Constructivist and surrealist influences, somewhat reminiscent of the school of art initiated by Uruguayan artist Joaquín Torres García.
Jorge Chediak is a lawyer and judge, member of the Supreme Court.

Jorge Majfud (1969-), architect and writer
Malena Muyala (1971-), singer
Hebert Abimorad, journalist and poet of Lebanese descent

See also 
 Lebanon–Uruguay relations
 Lebanese diaspora
 Arab diaspora
 Arab Uruguayans

References

External links

Arab Uruguayan
 
Immigration to Uruguay
Lebanese immigration to Uruguay
Lebanese diaspora in South America
Uruguay